Ingworth is a village and a civil parish in the English county of Norfolk. The nearest railway station is at North Walsham, which is located on the Bittern Line between Sheringham and Norwich. The nearest airport is Norwich International Airport. The village is bypassed by the A140 road,  to the west. The village and parish of Ingworth had, in the 2001 census, a population of 94. For the purposes of local government, the village falls within the district of North Norfolk. The population taken at the 2011 census remained less than 100 and was included in the civil parish of Erpingham.

Description
The parish of Ingworth is very small and covers an area spanning only 212 hectares. The parish has borders with three other parishes. To the north is the parish of Erpingham, to the south-west is the parish of Blickling and the parish of Aylsham is to the south-southeast. The boundary with the parish of Blickling is indicated by the course of the River Bure which also skirts the western edge of the village. Norwich road which runs north to south through the village and parish was once the main road from Norwich to Cromer before the Aylsham by-pass was built. This route can be clearly seen on Faden's large-scale map (at one inch to the mile) of the county of Norfolk of 1779. The village has no pub, shop or post office although there is a traditional-style phone box. There is also a small playground provided by the parish council. The parish council meets monthly in the village reading room. The village's name comes from the Old English for Inga’s enclosure.

History

The Domesday Book
Ingworth has an entry in the Domesday Book of 1085 where it, its population, land ownership and productive resources were extensively detailed In the survey Ingworth is recorded by the names of Ingewrda and Inghewurda. The main tenants being the Roger Bigot and Reynald Fitzlvo. The survey also list that there was ½ a mill. In the Domesday survey fractions, in this case ½ a mill, were used to indicate that the entry was on an estate that lay within more than one parish.

References

External links

St Lawrence's on the European Round Tower Churches Website

Villages in Norfolk
North Norfolk
Civil parishes in Norfolk